Sayed Abdel Gadir (born 22 September 1936) is a Sudanese boxer. He competed in the 1960 and 1968 Summer Olympics.

References

1936 births
Living people
Featherweight boxers
Lightweight boxers
People from Upper Nile (state)
Boxers at the 1960 Summer Olympics
Boxers at the 1968 Summer Olympics
South Sudanese male boxers
Sudanese male boxers
Olympic boxers of Sudan